The Driving School Association of the Americas (DSAA) is a trade association for driving school owners, founded in 1973.

Overview

The DSAA represents 8,000 businesses in the USA, that are engaged in driver's education including 6,000 professional driving schools . Through its membership, the DSAA represents 50,000 driving educators.  The DSAA is one of the largest organizations in the world that focuses on improving road traffic safety and reducing death and injury from road traffic accidents. The DSAA is headquartered in the USA in Kettering, Ohio.

References

External links
 DSAA Official Website

See also 
 Transportation safety in the United States

Trade associations based in the United States
Driver's education
Educational organizations based in the United States
Transportation in the United States
Road safety
Professional associations based in the United States
Educational institutions established in 1973